Dragana Kostić (born 1971) is a politician in Serbia. She has served in the National Assembly of Serbia since 2016 as a member of the Serbian Progressive Party.

Private career
Kostić lives in Sokobanja. She is a graduate economist and has been deputy director of the public enterprise PEU "Resavica."

Political career
Kostić was a founding member of the Serbian Progressive Party in Sokobanja in 2008. She was the vice-president of the party's municipal committee from 2008 to 2015 and now serves as a Progressive Party member of the municipal assembly.

She received the 108th position on the party's Aleksandar Vučić – Serbia Is Winning coalition electoral list for the 2016 Serbian parliamentary election and was elected when the list won 131 out of 250 parliamentary mandates. She is currently a deputy member of the parliamentary committee on human and minority rights and gender equality; a deputy member of the committee on Kosovo-Metohija; a deputy member of culture and information committee; the head of the parliamentary friendship group with Poland; and a member of the parliamentary friendship groups with Belarus, China, the Czech Republic, Indonesia, Kazakhstan, Russia, and the United Kingdom.

References

1971 births
Living people
People from Sokobanja
Members of the National Assembly (Serbia)
Serbian Progressive Party politicians